The Union of Democratic Forces of Guinea (UFDG) is a social-liberal political party in Guinea.

The party was founded in 1991 by a number of opposition parties and groups. In October 2002 it was joined by a section of Union for Progress and Renewal under the leadership of Mamadou Boye Bah, which unlike the majority of their party wanted to boycott the 2002 parliamentary election. Mamadou Ba was subsequently elected as President of UFDG.  The party affiliated to the Republican Front for Democratic Change alliance, which intended to field a candidate in the 2003 presidential election.

From 2007 onwards the presidency of the party has been held by Cellou Dalein Diallo, who stood for the party in the 2010 presidential election, topping the poll in the first round before narrowly losing to Alpha Conde in the second round.

On 25 July 2015, Diallo was named as the UFDG's candidate for the 2015 presidential election at a party congress; he was also re-elected to lead the party for another five years.

Electoral history

Presidential elections

National Assembly elections

References

External links
Official website 

Political parties established in 1991
Political parties in Guinea
Liberal International
Liberal parties in Africa
1991 establishments in Guinea